Guillermo "Memo" Cañedo Malburg or Guillermo Cañedo III, (born 1986 in Mexico City) is a Mexican sports executive who is the current CEO of Comunicaciones F.C. He is the son of former Club America president, Guillermo Cañedo White. He is also the grandson of the late Guillermo Cañedo de la Bárcena, a well-known soccer executive and former FIFA vice-president. Cañedo formerly worked as a Sporting Manager at Club Tijuana Xoloitzcuintles de Caliente.

Club Tijuana

With the team's promotion to first division, Guillermo joined their ranks in 2011. He was a sporting manager and oversaw the operation of the youth squads and was responsible for the club's local amateur 7 on 7 league.

Comunicaciones F.C.

Guillermo replaced fellow Mexican Pedro Portilla White in June 2019, joining the newly appointed Sporting President, Juan Leonel Garcia.

See also

Club Tijuana Xoloitzcuintles de Caliente
Estadio Azteca
Club America

References

1986 births
Living people
Sportspeople from Mexico City
Association football executives